Cameron Joyce (born 6 June 1992) is a field hockey player from Australia.

Personal life
Cameron Joyce was born and raised in Port Pirie, South Australia.

Career

Club level
Throughout his junior career, Joyce played hockey for Risdon Hockey Club in Port Pirie. Following his move to Adelaide, South Australia, Joyce began playing for Port Adelaide District Hockey Club in Hockey SA's Premier League competition.

State level
Joyce plays representative hockey for his home state, South Australia in National Australian Championships. 

His last representation at junior level was at the 2013 Under–21 Australian Championship in Brisbane. In 2015, he represented the SA Hotshots for the last time in the Australian Hockey League in Darwin.

In 2019, Joyce represented South Australia for the first time in four years during the inaugural tournament of Hockey Australia's new domestic national league, Hockey One. He is a member of SA's team, the Adelaide Fire.

National level
Cameron Joyce was a member of the Australia U–21 national team, the 'Burras', from 2011 to 2013. During his junior national career, Joyce captained the team twice in 2013, at the AYOF and Junior Oceania Cup, winning gold at both.

Joyce last represented the Burras at the 2013 Junior World Cup, where the team finished fifth.

References

External links
 
 

1992 births
Living people
Australian male field hockey players
Male field hockey defenders